The 2022 IIHF U18 World Championship Division II was two international under-18 ice hockey tournaments organised by the International Ice Hockey Federation. The Division II A and Division II B tournaments represent the fourth and the fifth tier of the IIHF World U18 Championship.

Division II A

The Division II A tournament was played in Tallinn, Estonia, from 3 to 9 April 2022.

Participants

Final standings

Results
All times are local (UTC+3).

Division II B

The Division II B tournament was played in Sofia, Bulgaria, from 21 to 24 March 2022.

Participants

Final standings

Results
All times are local (UTC+2).

References

IIHF World U18 Championship Division II
2022 IIHF World U18 Championships
International ice hockey competitions hosted by Estonia
International ice hockey competitions hosted by Bulgaria
Sports competitions in Sofia
Sports competitions in Tallinn
2021–22 in Estonian ice hockey
2021–22 in Bulgarian ice hockey
IIHF
IIHF